Lomatia belzebul is a species of 'bee flies' belonging to the family Bombyliidae subfamily Lomatiinae.

Distribution
This species is mainly present in France, Greece, Italy, Portugal, southern Russia, Spain, Switzerland, in the eastern Palearctic realm, in the Near East, and in North Africa.

Description
Body is shining black. In males the thorax shows black hairs, tawny in females. The wings have a wide brown band close to costal margin. The abdomen is black, with yellow bord of the segments, except the first segment.

The striped abdomen can confuse these flies with some Hymenoptera for predators.

References

External links
 Nature Llliputienne
 Nature du Gard

Bombyliidae
Insects described in 1794
Diptera of Europe